List of football video games may refer to:

 List of association football video games (soccer)
 List of American football video games
 Chronology of indoor American football video games
 List of Australian rules football video games